Isidorea is a genus of flowering plants in the family Rubiaceae. It is endemic to the islands of Cuba and Hispaniola (the Dominican Republic and Haiti) in the Caribbean.

Species

References

External links 
 World Checklist of Rubiaceae

Rubiaceae genera
Chiococceae